Events from the year 1987 in Ireland.

Incumbents
 President: Patrick Hillery
 Taoiseach:
 Garret FitzGerald (FG) (until 10 March 1987)
 Charles Haughey (FF) (from 10 March 1987)
 Tánaiste:
 Dick Spring (Lab) (until 20 January 1987)
 Peter Barry  (FG) (from 20 January 1987 until 10 March 1987)
 Brian Lenihan (FF) (from 10 March 1987)
 Minister for Finance:
 John Bruton (FG) (until 10 March 1987)
 Ray MacSharry (FF) (from 10 March 1987)
 Chief Justice: Thomas Finlay
 Dáil:
 24th (until 20 January 1987)
 25th (from 10 March 1987)
 Seanad:
 17th (until 3 April 1987)
 18th (from 25 April 1987)

Events
 1 January – The halfpenny coin was withdrawn from circulation.
 20 January – Labour Party ministers resigned from the government because of disagreement over budget proposals.
 19 February – A general election returned a Fianna Fáil minority government with Charles Haughey as Taoiseach.
 11 March – Former Taoiseach Garret FitzGerald resigned the leadership of the Fine Gael party and was succeeded by Alan Dukes.
 22 March – The Irish National Lottery was launched.
 28 March – The National Lottery launched its first scratch cards.
 8 May – Loughgall ambush: the British Special Air Service killed eight Provisional Irish Republican Army members and a civilian in Loughgall, County Tyrone.
 9 May – Johnny Logan won the Eurovision Song Contest for Ireland with his own composition Hold Me Now, making him the only person to win the competition twice as a performer.
 26 May – A referendum was held on the Single European Act. Nearly 70% voted in favour of the Tenth amendment to the Constitution.
 26 July – Stephen Roche won the Tour de France.
 8 November – Remembrance Day bombing: Eleven people were killed by an IRA bomb during a Remembrance Day service in Enniskillen.
 10 November – The funeral took place of broadcaster Eamonn Andrews.
 29 November – Beaumont Hospital opened in Dublin.
 5 December – Downpatrick and Ardglass Railway began public operation, the first Irish gauge heritage railway in Ireland.
 Undated – Cooley Distillery began producing Irish whiskey.

Arts and literature
 U2 released The Joshua Tree album to international acclaim.
 Maeve Binchy's novel Firefly Summer was published.
 Roddy Doyle published his first novel, The Commitments, the first volume of The Barrytown Trilogy, about a group of unemployed young people on the north side of Dublin who start a soul band.
Kíla, the folk/world music group, was formed in the Irish language secondary school, Coláiste Eoin in County Dublin.

Sport

Association football
 11 November – Ireland qualified for their first major international tournament when Scotland pulled off a shock 1–0 win in Sofia against Bulgaria. Gary Mackay scored the only goal with just three minutes left to put Ireland into the Euro 88 tournament in West Germany.

Cycling

 6 September – Cyclist Stephen Roche completed a remarkable treble by winning the Giro d'Italia, the Tour de France, and the World Championship.

Gaelic football
 Meath defeated Cork by 1–14 to 0–11 to win the All-Ireland Senior Football Championship.

Golf
 The Carroll's Irish Open golf tournament was won by Bernhard Langer (West Germany).

Hurling
 Galway defeated Kilkenny by 1–12 to 0–9 to win the All-Ireland Senior Hurling Championship.

Births

2 January – Cathal Naughton, Cork hurler.
9 January – Nicola Coughlan, actress
22 January – Shane Long, soccer player.
24 January – Ruth Bradley, television actress.
30 January – Becky Lynch, professional wrestler.
4 February – Darren O'Dea, soccer player.
5 February – Denis McLaughlin, soccer player.
14 February – James Chambers, soccer player.
16 March – Diarmuid O'Carroll, soccer player.
2 April – Shane Lowry, golfer
13 April – Conor Sammon, soccer player.
23 April – Kelly Gough, actress.
12 May – Darren Randolph, soccer player.
20 May – Pa Cronin, Cork hurler.
21 May – Chris McCann, soccer player.
7 July – Diarmuid Connolly, Dublin Gaelic football and hurling player.
9 July – Jonny Hayes, soccer player.
28 September – Gary Deegan, soccer player.
 2 June – Graeme Mulcahy, hurler (Kilmallock, Limerick).
 2 October – Séamus Hickey, hurler (Murroe-Boher, Limerick).
11 October – Richie McCarthy, hurler (Blackrock, Limerick).
16 October – Eric McGill, soccer player.
9 November – Tom Condon, hurler (Limerick).
16 November – T. J. Reid, Kilkenny hurler.
13 December – Billy Clarke, soccer player.

Deaths
2 January – Roger McHugh, professor, author and playwright (born 1908).
4 January – Eudie Coughlan, Cork hurler (born 1900).
14 January – Ewart Milne, poet (born 1903).
January – Billy King, cricketer (born 1902).
8 April – Kevin McNamara, Archbishop of Dublin (Roman Catholic) (born 1926).
19 April – Con Cremin, diplomat (born 1908).
22 April – Bill Hayes, soccer player (born 1915).
23 April – Oliver J. Flanagan, Fine Gael TD and Cabinet Minister (born 1920).
27 April – Maurice Gibson, Northern Irish judge (born 1913).
8 May – Jim Lynagh, Provisional Irish Republican Army member killed in an ambush by the SAS during an attack on Loughgall RUC station (born 1956).
22 June – John Hewitt, poet (born 1907).
30 June – Tommy O'Connor, soccer player.
20 July – Denis J. O'Sullivan, Fine Gael TD (born 1918).
18 October – Michael Lipper, Labour Party politician and TD (born 1932).
29 October – Monk Gibbon, poet and author (born 1896).
5 November – Eamonn Andrews, broadcaster (born 1922).
25 November – James McDyer, Roman Catholic priest and community leader (born 1910).
8 December – Peadar Livingstone, priest and historian (born 1930).
9 December – Seán Brosnahan, Treasurer INTO, member of the Seanad from 1961 to 1977 (born 1911).

Full date unknown
Jimmy Warnock, boxer (born 1912).

See also
1987 in Irish television

References

 
1980s in Ireland
Years of the 20th century in Ireland
Ireland